Hungry Heart is a 1987 Australian film about a love affair that goes wrong.

Plot
Doctor Sal Bono falls in love with wool classer Kate Maloney.

Production
The film was shot in August 1987 at the house of producer-writer Rosa Colosimo.

References

External links

Hungry Heart at TCMDB

Australian drama films
1987 films
1980s English-language films
1980s Australian films